Chandra Kumar Agarwala (28 November 1867 – 2 March 1938) was an eminent writer, poet, journalist from Assam. He is a pioneer people of Jonaki Era, the age of romanticism of Assamese literature. Agarwala was titled as Pratimar Khonikor in Assamese literature. Agarwala was the first editor and financer of the Jonaki magazine and a founder member of Oxomiya Bhaxa Unnati Xadhini Xobha, a literary organization of Assam with his intimate friends Lakshminath Bezbarua and Hemchandra Goswami. Agarwala, along with his friend Lakshminath and Hemchandra, are known as "Trimurti of Assamese literature" for their remarkable contribution to the very beginning of modern Assamese literature. Chandra Kumar Agarwala was the brother of writer and poet Ananda Chandra Agarwala and uncle of Jyoti Prasad Agarwala, a noted poet, playwright, composer, lyricist, writer and first Assamese Filmmaker.

Early life and education
Chandra Kumar Agarwala was  born at Brahmajan near Gohpur in Sonitpur district on 28 October 1867. He was the second son of Haribilash Agarwala. He was from a rich business family of Assam. Chandra Kumar started his education at Tezpur. After passing FA, he took admission into the BA classes of the same college, but returned home, without completing his BA.

Literacy works

Some of his poetry books are:
Bon kunwori(1st assamese romantic poem)
</ref> Pratima (প্ৰতিমা) (1914),
 Bin-boragi (বীণবৰাগী) (1923),
 Chandramrit (চন্দ্ৰামৃত)(1967)

Death
Chandra Kumar Agarwala died on 2 March 1938 at his house at Uzan Bazaar in Guwahati, Assam.

See also
 Assamese literature
 History of Assamese literature
 List of Assamese-language poets
 List of Assamese writers with their pen names

References

External links
 Read original writings of Chandra Kumar Agarwala at Assamese wikisource.
 Nature a poem by Chandra Kumar Agarwala translated into English at indianreview.in.

Poets from Assam
Assamese-language poets
1867 births
1938 deaths
People from Sonitpur district
University of Calcutta alumni
Journalists from Assam
20th-century Indian poets
19th-century Indian poets
Indian male poets
19th-century Indian male writers
20th-century Indian male writers